Oleg Valeryevich Pavlov (born 26 November 1966) is a Russian former speed skater. He competed in three events at the 1994 Winter Olympics.

References

External links
 

1966 births
Living people
Russian male speed skaters
Olympic speed skaters of Russia
Speed skaters at the 1994 Winter Olympics
Sportspeople from Yekaterinburg